Peter Hargraves (born August 30, 1972) is an American retired sprinter.

References

1972 births
Living people
American male sprinters
Universiade medalists in athletics (track and field)
Place of birth missing (living people)
Universiade gold medalists for the United States
Medalists at the 1995 Summer Universiade